The 1983 San Diego Padres season was the 15th season in franchise history. The team finished with an 81–81 record, their second year in a row finishing 81-81. They scored 653 runs and allowed 653 runs for a run differential of zero, becoming only the second team (after the 1922 Chicago White Sox) with a .500 winning percentage and a zero run differential.

Offseason
 November 3, 1982: Dave Edwards was released by the Padres.
 November 18, 1982: Broderick Perkins and Juan Eichelberger were traded by the Padres to the Cleveland Indians for Ed Whitson.
 December 21, 1982: Steve Garvey was signed as a free agent by the Padres.

Regular season
 In 1983, Steve Garvey set a National League record with 1207 consecutive games played. The streak lasted from September 3, 1975, to July 29, 1983. The streak ended when he broke his thumb in a collision at home plate against the Atlanta Braves.

Opening Day starters
Juan Bonilla
Dave Dravecky
Steve Garvey
Ruppert Jones
Terry Kennedy
Sixto Lezcano
Gene Richards
Luis Salazar
Garry Templeton

Season standings

Record vs. opponents

Notable transactions
 April 19, 1983: Bobby Brown was signed as a free agent with the San Diego Padres.
 May 4, 1983: Chris Welsh was purchased from the Padres by the Montreal Expos.
 May 22, 1983: Joe Lefebvre was traded by the Padres to the Philadelphia Phillies for Sid Monge.
 August 31, 1983: Sixto Lezcano and a player to be named later were traded by the Padres to the Philadelphia Phillies for players to be named later. The Phillies completed their part of the deal by sending Marty Decker, Ed Wojna, Lance McCullers, and Darren Burroughs (minors) to the Padres on September 20. The Padres completed their part of the deal by sending Steve Fireovid to the Phillies on October 11.

Roster

Player stats

Batting

Starters by position
Note: Pos = Position; G = Games played; AB = At bats; H = Hits; Avg. = Batting average; HR = Home runs; RBI = Runs batted in

Other batters
Note: G = Games played; AB = At bats; H = Hits; Avg. = Batting average; HR = Home runs; RBI = Runs batted in

Pitching

Starting pitchers
Note: G = Games pitched; IP = Innings pitched; W = Wins; L = Losses; ERA = Earned run average; SO = Strikeouts

Other pitchers
Note: G = Games pitched; IP = Innings pitched; W = Wins; L = Losses; ERA = Earned run average; SO = Strikeouts

Relief pitchers
Note: G = Games pitched; W = Wins; L = Losses; SV = Saves; ERA = Earned run average; SO = Strikeouts

Award winners

1983 Major League Baseball All-Star Game

Farm system

LEAGUE CHAMPIONS: Beaumont

References

External links
 1983 San Diego Padres team at Baseball-Reference
 1983 San Diego Padres at Baseball Almanac

San Diego Padres seasons
San Diego Padres season
San Diego Padres